Systenocentrus is a genus of harvestmen in the family Sclerosomatidae from Southeast and East Asia.

Species
 Systenocentrus confucianus Hirst, 1911
 Systenocentrus galeatus (Thorell, 1889)
 Systenocentrus japonicus Hirst, 1911
 Systenocentrus luteobiseriatus S. Suzuki, 1982
 Systenocentrus quinquedentatus Simon, 1886
 Systenocentrus rufus Roewer, 1955

References

Harvestmen
Harvestman genera